Rite Time is the eleventh and final studio album by the German rock band Can. It is considered a reunion album because of the time elapsed since the band's previous album, Can, which had been released in 1979. The album consists of sessions recorded in the South of France in late 1986, edited extensively by the band over the course of subsequent years. Rite Time features the vocals of the band's original singer, Malcolm Mooney, who had left the group in 1970 after their debut album Monster Movie. Upon the album's initial release, "In the Distance Lies the Future" only appeared on the CD version, but it was subsequently featured on the 2014 vinyl reissue.

Track listing

Personnel
Can
Malcolm Mooney – lead vocals
Michael Karoli – guitar, chorus vocals, pocket organ, bass
Irmin Schmidt – keyboards, kalimba
Holger Czukay – bass, French horn, synthesizer, dictaphone
Jaki Liebezeit – drums, percussion

References

1989 albums
Can (band) albums
Mute Records albums